Vexillum rugosum is a species of small sea snail, marine gastropod mollusk in the family Costellariidae, the ribbed miters.

The subspecies Vexillum rugosum intermediatum [sic] has become a synonym of Vexillum (Vexillum) intermedium (Kiener, 1838)

References

External links
  Liénard, Élizé. Catalogue de la faune malacologique de l'île Maurice et de ses dépendances comprenant les îles Seychelles, le groupe de Chagos composé de Diego-Garcia, Six-îles, Pèros-Banhos, Salomon, etc., l'île Rodrigues, l'île de Cargados ou Saint-Brandon. J. Tremblay, 1877.
  Cernohorsky, Walter Oliver. The Mitridae of Fiji; The veliger vol. 8 (1965)

rugosum
Gastropods described in 1791